Earl Granville is a title that has been created twice, once in the Peerage of Great Britain and once in the Peerage of the United Kingdom. It is now held by members of the Leveson-Gower family.

First creation
The first creation came in the Peerage of Great Britain in 1715 when Grace Carteret, Lady Carteret, was made Countess Granville and Viscountess Carteret. She was the daughter of John Granville, 1st Earl of Bath, and the widow of George Carteret, 1st Baron Carteret. The Carteret family descended from the celebrated royalist statesman George Carteret, who had been created a baronet, of Melesches, Jersey, in 1645. It was later intended that he should be elevated to the peerage but he died before the title could be granted. As his eldest son, Philip, predeceased him, the peerage was eventually bestowed on his namesake grandson, George, who was made Baron Carteret, of Hawnes in the County of Bedford, in 1681, with remainder to his brothers.

Lord Carteret and Lady Granville were both succeeded by their son, the second Earl. He was a prominent statesman, mainly known under the title Lord Carteret. The titles became extinct in 1776 on the death of his son, the third Earl, without heirs. The Carteret estates were passed on to the late Earl's first cousin, the Hon. Henry Frederick Thynne, second son of Thomas Thynne, 2nd Viscount Weymouth, and his wife Lady Louisa Carteret, daughter of the second Earl Granville. He assumed the surname of Carteret and was created Baron Carteret in 1784.

Second creation

The second creation came in the Peerage of the United Kingdom in 1833 when the noted diplomat Granville Leveson-Gower, 1st Viscount Granville, was made Earl Granville and Baron Leveson, of Stone Park in the County of Stafford. He had already been created Viscount Granville, of Stone Park in the County of Stafford, in 1815. Leveson-Gower was the son of Granville Leveson-Gower, 1st Marquess of Stafford, by his third wife, Susanna. He was the younger half-brother of George Granville Leveson-Gower, 1st Duke of Sutherland, and the uncle of Francis Egerton, 1st Earl of Ellesmere. He was also a great-great-nephew of the aforementioned Grace Carteret, 1st Countess Granville. Hence, the 1833 creation of the earldom of Granville was a revival of the title created in 1715.

Lord Granville was succeeded by his son, the second Earl. He was a prominent Liberal politician and served three times as Foreign Secretary. His son, the third Earl, was also a diplomat and notably served as Ambassador to Belgium from 1928 to 1933. He was succeeded by his younger brother, the fourth Earl. He was a vice-admiral in the Royal Navy and also served as Governor of Northern Ireland from 1945 to 1952. Lord Granville married Lady Rose Constance Bowes-Lyon, second surviving daughter of Claude Bowes-Lyon, 14th Earl of Strathmore and Kinghorne, and elder sister of Lady Elizabeth Bowes-Lyon, wife of King George VI.

, the titles are held by his grandson, the sixth Earl, who succeeded his father in 1996.

The Hon. Frederick Leveson-Gower, younger son of the first Earl, was Member of Parliament for Derby, Stoke-upon-Trent and Bodmin. His son George Leveson-Gower was also a Member of Parliament.

The family seat is Callernish House, near Lochmaddy, North Uist.

Carteret baronets, of Melesches (1645)
Sir George Carteret, 1st Baronet (c. 1610–1680)
Sir Philip Carteret (died 1672)
Sir George Carteret, 2nd Baronet (1669–1695) (created Baron Carteret in 1681)

Barons Carteret (1681)
George Carteret, 1st Baron Carteret (1669–1695)
John Carteret, 2nd Baron Carteret (1690–1763) (succeeded as Earl Granville in 1744)

Earls Granville, first creation (1715)
Grace Carteret, 1st Countess Granville (1654–1744)
John Carteret, 2nd Earl Granville (1690–1763)
Robert Carteret, 3rd Earl Granville (1721–1776)

Earls Granville, second creation (1833)
Granville Leveson-Gower, 1st Earl Granville (1773–1846)
Granville George Leveson-Gower, 2nd Earl Granville (1815–1891)
Granville George Leveson-Gower, 3rd Earl Granville (1872–1939)
William Spencer Leveson-Gower, 4th Earl Granville (1880–1953)
Granville James Leveson-Gower, 5th Earl Granville (1918–1996)
(Granville George) Fergus Leveson-Gower, 6th Earl Granville (born 1959)

The heir apparent is the present holder's son, Granville George James Leveson-Gower, Lord Leveson (born 1999).

See also
Earl of Bath (1661 creation)
Baron Carteret
Duke of Sutherland
Countess of Sutherland
Earl of Ellesmere
Earl of Cromartie

References

Sources

Kidd, Charles, Williamson, David (editors). Debrett's Peerage and Baronetage (1990 edition). New York: St Martin's Press, 1990.

External links

Cracroft's Peerage page

 
1715 establishments in Great Britain
1776 disestablishments in Great Britain
1833 establishments in the United Kingdom
Extinct earldoms in the Peerage of Great Britain
Earldoms in the Peerage of the United Kingdom
Noble titles created in 1715
Noble titles created in 1833
Noble titles created for UK MPs